Jo Kogstad Ringheim (born 16 February 1991) is a Norwegian former professional road cyclist.

Major results
2013
 9th Handzame Classic

References

1991 births
Living people
Norwegian male cyclists